Karsten Konrad (born 1962) is a German abstract sculptor.

Biography 
Having studied at Hochschule der Künste in Berlin and at the Royal College of Art in London in the late 1980s both under English sculptor David Evison and Yugoslavian performance artist Marina Abramović, his reoccurring themes are »Identity and Memory«, »Material and History«, »Structuralism and Linguistics«, as well as »Urbanity and Urbanism«.

For more than 20 years, his work has been exhibited in museums and institutions throughout Europe, North-America, and Asia. For example, in autumn of 2012 he was awarded with the Great Prize of the 53rd Belgrade October Salon for his site-specific intervention at the Geozavod / Belgrade Cooperative-building (1907).

Between 2010 and 2013 he has been professor at Universität der Künste Berlin and the China Academy of Art Hangzhou.

Sculpture for Konrad is an unerring instrument of analysis in order to examine and inspect our reality. Archaeologically he digs out the buried hopes and modernist utopias inscribed in discarded commodities, furniture, machines, and architectures. In a kind of modernist ›house clearing‹ he surveys a future that was – art history (e.g. Smith, Caro, Stella) as well as the social dreams located covertly in articles of daily use – for its contemporary capability; thus, relocating it into our very own present.

He lives and works in Berlin.

Solo exhibitions 

2014
Silver Convention, Diehl Cube, Berlin
Silence and Outbreak (with Jens Wolf), Galerie Ruth Leuchter, Düsseldorf

2013
Aldo’s House, Galerie Ruth Leuchter, Düsseldorf
South by Southwest, Galerie Anja Rumig, Stuttgart
Wohnungsaufloesung, Pablo’s Birthday, New York

2012
Elegantly wasted (with Markus Eek), Landskrona Konsthall, Landskrona

2011
Gutterpearls, Galerie Pablo’s Birthday, New York
Ultramöbel (with Jan Mioduszewski), Polnisches Kulturinstitut, Berlin

2010
Standing on the never never (with Torben Giehler), Galerie MøllerWitt, Aarhus
Zuspiel, Künstlerhaus Bethanien, Berlin
Material boys (with Henrik Eiben), Pablo’s Birthday, New York

2009
World of Woodcraft, loop – raum für aktuelle Kunst, Berlin

2008
Karsten Konrad, Arndt & Partner, Berlin

2007
Zigzag Zürich, Arndt & Partner, Zurich

2006
Escultura, loop – raum für aktuelle kunst, Berlin

2005
Karsten Konrad, Galerie Rehbein, Köln

2004
Karsten Konrad, Galerie Kapinos, Berlin
Baptisterium, Future 7, Berlin

2002
Archeologica industriale, loop – raum für aktuelle kunst, Berlin
Haus, Galerie Schmela, Düsseldorf

2001
Mikadoreflex (with Achim Kobe), Galerie Mark Müller, Zurich

2000
Architypes, Haus des Lehrers, Berlin
Berlin 563 km, Galerie der Stadt Mainz

1998
Surplus, loop – raum für aktuelle kunst, Berlin

1997
Poelzig‘s Hovercraft, Volksbühne, Berlin
Softdock, Soma, Berlin
Halfloop, loop – raum für aktuelle kunst, Berlin
Karsten Konrad‚ Johnson & Johnson Fine Arts, Berlin

1996
Galatasaray Tanzkulübü, Mysliwska, Berlin
TwinTrier, Kunstverein Trier

1995
Minotaurussandwich, Kunsthalle Moabit, Berlin

1994
Karsten Konrad, Museum of Installation, London

Group exhibitions 

2015
Wo ist hier? # 2: Raum und Gegenwart, Kunstverein Reutlingen
2014
Stahlskulptur in Deutschland, Kunstverein Wilhelmshöhe, Ettlingen
Sieben, Museum Ritter, Waldenbuch
Bielefeld contemporary, Bielefelder Kunstverein, Bielefeld
Sammlung Florian Peters-Messer, Kunsthaus Potsdam
Good taste, hopefully, Alexander Ochs, Berlin
About sculpture, Lady Fitness, Berlin
Bento Box, Galerie Anja Rumig, Stuttgart
Psycho Killer, qu'est-ce que c'est, Galerie Börgmann, Monchengladbach
Sand in Vaseline, Black Market, Berlin

2013
Sammlung zeitgenössischer Kunst der Bundesrepublik Deutschland: Ankäufe 2007–2011, Bundeskunsthalle, Bonn
Bogota, Hotel Bogota, Berlin
le’Oiseau present: 2,3 bis 3D, Ballhaus, Berlin
Black Market, Stockholm
Grötzinger – Konrad – Schwarzwald, Galerie Patrick Ebensperger, Berlin
Hit and run – Klasse Karsten Konrad, Kulturforum Schloss Holte-Stukenbrock
Abstract possibilities, Roger Björkholmen Gallery, Stockholm
Differenz und Wiederholung, Galerie Knut Hartwich, Sellin
Alles Wasser, Galerie Mikael Andersen, Copenhagen

2012
53rd October Salon: Good Life – Physical Narratives and Spatial Imaginations, Belgrade
Robert Jacobsen up to date, Esbjerg Kunstmuseum, Esbjerg
Hinterland, Arch 402, London
Apes presents, Diehl, Berlin
Es gibt ... There is ..., b-05, Montabaur
Abstract confusion, Kunsthalle Erfurt
le Trac, Frontviews Gallery, Berlin
Tysk Var, Galerie Britt Arnstedt, Östra Karup
Abstract confusion,  Neue Galerie Gladbeck
Kaleidoscope, Patrick Heide, London

2011
1st Bosnia and Herzegovina Biennale of Contemporary Art: No Network, D-0 ARK, Konjic
Abstrakt////Skulptur, Georg-Kolbe-Museum, Berlin
Abstract confusion, Kunstverein Ulm
Simply the best, loop – raum für aktuelle Kunst, Berlin
Sommergäste, Galerie Martin Mertens, Berlin
Licht, Luft, Liebe, Potsdam
Abstract confuseon, b-05, Montabaur

2010
A Gathering of the Tribes, Universität der Künste, Berlin
Realstadt – Wünsche als Wirklichkeit, Kraftwerk Mitte, Berlin
Horizonte, Altes Museum Neukölln, Berlin
Barbar, Appartement, Berlin
Changing the World, Arndt, Berlin
Black / White, T27, Berlin

2009
Axis: Bold as Love, Forgotten Bar, Berlin
Zeigen. Eine Audiotour, Temporäre Kunsthalle Berlin
Berlin 2000, PaceWildenstein, New York
Berlin 89/09. Kunst zwischen Spurensuche und Utopie, Berlinische Galerie, Berlin
Echo-ecology, Shinan, Guangzhou
News from the Studio, Arndt & Partner, Berlin
Neue Deutsche Skulptur, Upstairs, Berlin
Indecent Exposure, loop – raum für aktuelle Kunst, Berlin

2008
30 gegen 3.000.000 – Malerei und Skulptur aus Berlin, Kulturforum Schloß Holte-Stukenbrock
Refraction, loop – raum für aktuelle Kunst

2007
Neuer Konstruktivismus, Kunstverein Bielefeld
Changing Spaces, Städtische Galerie Waldkraiburg
We love Kylie, loop – raum für aktuelle Kunst
Sublime: Experiences and Perceptions in Contemporary Sculpture, Parra & Romero, Madrid

2006
Talking Cities, Zeche Zollverein, Essen
Shift / Scale, Kumu Artmuseum, Tallinn
Happy Hour, Galerie Stefan Rasche, Münster
Special Space, Arndt & Partner, Berlin

2005
The Addiction, Gagosian Gallery Berlin
km 0, Museo del Artes, Santa Cruz
Situated Self, Tennis Palace art Museum, Helsinki
Cosmic Logic, Galerie Jette Rudolph, Berlin
Was wäre, wenn, Galerie für Zeitgenössische Kunst, Leipzig
Galerie Kapinos, Berlin
Toronto in Berlin, loop- raum für aktuelle kunst, Berlin
Situated Self, Museum of Contemporary Art, Belgrade

2004
Konstruktion | Statik, loop – raum für aktuelle kunst, Berlin

2003
Sampler, loop – raum für aktuelle kunst, Berlin
Das Atmen der Stadt, Haus am Waldsee, Berlin
Modern Islands, Projektraum, Dresden

2002
EU2, Stephen Friedman Gallery, London
Urbane Sequenzen, Kunsthalle Erfurt
reloop, loop – raum für aktuelle kunst, Berlin
Sub-Urbane Modelle, Galerie der Stadt Schwaz / Tirol

2001
Berlin_London_2001, ICA – Institute of Contemporary Arts, London
Quobo, Hamburger Bahnhof, Berlin
Utopien heute, Kunstverein Ludwigshafen
Modell | Skulptur, NBK, Berlin

2000
Luggage, Galerie Max Hetzler, Berlin
Randori, loop – raum für aktuelle kunst, Berlin
Satellit, Akademie der Künste, Berlin
Surface, Kunstforum, Munich
Forty minus One, Duende Activiteiten, Rotterdam
Unsquare Dance, Eigen+Art, Leipzig
Mysliwska, Künstlerhaus Bethanien, Berlin

1999
Sechzehn Räume, Berlin 1999, loop – raum für aktuelle kunst, Berlin
Untitled, Galerie Fricke, Düsseldorf

1998
Sehen sehen '98, loop - raum für aktuelle kunst, Berlin
Misbits, Galerie Fricke, Berlin
Ceterum Censeo, Galerie im Marstall, Berlin

1995
Archive, Museum of Installation, London

1994
Whitechapel Open, Whitechapel Gallery, London

Private and public collections 

Bundeskunstsammlung
Museum Ritter, Waldenbuch
MoCA Belgrade
IfA Stuttgart / Berlin

See also 
 Sculptors
 Sculpture

References

External links 

 Official website: karstenkonrad.de
 Pablo’s Birthday, New York
 Arndt Berlin / Singapore
 Diehl Cube, Berlin
 Galerie Ruth Leuchter, Düsseldorf
 October Salon Belgrade

1962 births
20th-century German sculptors
20th-century German male artists
German male sculptors
21st-century German sculptors
21st-century German male artists
German installation artists
Living people